Viresh Mukesh Borkar is an Indian politician from Goa and a member of the Goa Legislative Assembly. He is President of Revolutionary Goans Party (RGP) and was one of its founding members. Borkar won the St. Andre Assembly constituency on the RGP ticket in the 2022 Goa Legislative Assembly election. 

Borkar defeated four-time MLA and former sports minister Francisco Silveira of the Bharatiya Janata Party by a margin of 76 votes, winning the RGP's first seat in the assembly. Borkar was the youngest MLA elected to the assembly since Mauvin Godinho (25) and Victor Gonsalves (27) were elected in 1989.

Early life and education 
Borkar was born to Mukesh Dattaram Borkar in Neura, Goa, where he was brought up. His grandfather Dattaram Pandhari Borkar was a freedom fighter, an activist for Indian independence, who inspired young Borkar to follow his footsteps.

Like other teenagers, Borkar was eager to become a successful businessman so that he could make enough money to live comfortably . He completed his Higher Secondary School Certificate in Father Agnel's Higher Secondary School, Goa in 2010. He later dropped out of a computer diploma course, and took courses in agriculture and farming.

References

1994 births
Living people
Goa MLAs 2022–2027
People from North Goa district